Burdekin Catholic High School (commonly referred to as BCH or by its official acronym BCHS) is a private, co-educational Catholic secondary school in the town of Ayr, Queensland, Australia. The school is part of the Roman Catholic Diocese of Townsville. It is one of two high schools in the town, the other being Ayr State High School

History
The school was established in 1974 as a result of the amalgamation of Edmund Campion College, founded by the Marist Brothers in 1953, and St Francis Xavier Convent High School, founded by the Sisters of the Good Samaritan in 1945.

In 2011 Kristine Maree Grasso, a teacher and netball coach, was suspended and banned from teaching after having a sexual affair with a student.

Student population
The school has a population of 548 students. The school has a reputation locally as being a progressive Christian school, with students born out of wedlock and students from all other faiths.

Facilities
There are two multi-story buildings and an auditorium that used to function as a church. The school curriculum is the same as all other Queensland schools with the addition of Roman Catholic Religion.

References

Catholic secondary schools in Queensland
Ayr, Queensland
1953 establishments in Australia
Educational institutions established in 1953
Roman Catholic Diocese of Townsville